Matteo Scozzarella (born 5 June 1988) is an Italian professional footballer who plays as a midfielder.

Club career

Atalanta and Portogruaro 
During the 2006–07 season he was integrated in the first squad, without however featuring in any match.

In summer of 2007, Scozzarella joined Lega Pro side Portogruaro in a co-ownership deal with Atalanta. In his first season, he played 18 league games and scored three goals. Portogruaro extended the co-ownership deal for a second season, where Scozzarella helped his side gain promotion to the 2010–11 Serie B.

Loan to Juve Stabia 
Following the 2010–11 season, Scozzarella re-joined Atalanta, who sent him on loan to newly promoted Serie B team Juve Stabia on 17 July 2011. He made his debut on 14 August, against Sassuolo in the Coppa Italia. On 24 September, on matchday 6 of the league, Scozzarella scored his first goal for Juve Stabia, in a 3–2 win over Pescara.

Return to Atalanta and loans 
After the loan, he returned to Atalanta, and played with the first team during the 2012–13 season. He made his Atalanta debut on 19 August 2012, in a 2–0 Coppa Italia win over Padova. His Serie A debut came on 30 September, coming on as a substitute in the 67th minute against Torino.

Following three Serie A games with Atalanta, all as a substitute, on 23 January 2013 Scozzarella joined Serie B club Ternana on loan until the end of the season. He made his league debut three days later, while his debut as a starter came on 2 February, in a goalless draw against Bari. Scozzarella played 13 games during his loan.

On 30 August 2013, Scozzarella returned to Juve Stabia on loan; he was loaned to Spezia on 31 January 2014, also in the Serie B. On 22 July 2014 Scozzarella was sent on loan to Trapani.

Trapani 
On 14 July 2015, Scozzarella joined Trapani on a permanent deal, helping them finish in third place.

Parma 
In January 2017, Scozzarella joined Lega Pro side Parma on a two-year deal. He helped Parma gain two consecutive promotions, to the Serie B and to the Serie A. On 29 October 2019, Scozzarella been given one-match ban for blasphemy during a Serie A match. He played 90 games in all competitions for Parma in four years.

Monza 
On 5 January 2021, Scozzarella signed with newly-promoted Serie B side Monza on a six-month deal. He made his debut on 6 February, as a started in a 1–1 draw against Empoli. On 31 January 2023, his contract with Monza was terminated by mutual consent.

Career statistics

References

External links

 Profile at A.C. Monza 

Living people
1988 births
Footballers from Trieste
Association football midfielders
Italian footballers
A.S.D. Portogruaro players
Atalanta B.C. players
S.S. Juve Stabia players
Ternana Calcio players
Spezia Calcio players
Trapani Calcio players
Parma Calcio 1913 players
A.C. Monza players
Serie A players
Serie B players
Serie C players